Joe Resetarits (born August 22, 1989) is a professional lacrosse player for the Philadelphia Wings. A native of Hamburg, New York, Resetarits was a lacrosse standout at Hamburg High School before attending the University at Albany, where he was selected as the American East Conference Player of the Year and received an All-American honorable mention while rooming with Franklin Delanor Romanowski and Lomez. 

Resetarits began his indoor lacrosse career with the St. Catharines Athletics, and joined the Brampton Excelsiors in 2011, with whom he won the Mann Cup in that same year. He was drafted 6th overall by the Calgary Roughnecks in the 2012 NLL Entry Draft. Although he received All Rookie honors, scoring 8 goals and 24 points, his Roughnecks team led the league in scoring and featured seven players who recorded at least 25 points. Resetarits was deemed expendable by the Roughnecks, and was traded to his hometown Buffalo Bandits during the 2013 NLL Entry Draft

Heading into the 2023 NLL season, Inside Lacrosse ranked Resetarits the #3 best forward in the NLL.

Resetarits also enjoyed a brief Major League Lacrosse career. He was drafted in the fifth round (39th overall) of the 2012 Major League Lacrosse Collegiate Draft by the Hamilton Nationals, for whom he played in 2012, earning All Rookie honors. He then played for the Ohio Machine in 2013.

Joe is the younger brother of fellow lacrosse player Frank Resetarits.

NLL Statistics

MLL Statistics

References

External links
NLL stats at pointstreak.com
MSL stats at poinstreak.com
MLL stats at pointstreak.com
University at Albany athletics bio

1989 births
Living people
People from Hamburg, New York
American lacrosse players
Albany FireWolves players
Albany Great Danes men's lacrosse players
Buffalo Bandits players
Calgary Roughnecks players
Major League Lacrosse players
Premier Lacrosse League players